Paul J. "Pat" Rooney was an American professional basketball player. He played in the National Basketball League for the Detroit Gems and Tri-Cities Blackhawks. In 10 career games he averaged 1.5 points per contest.

References 

American men's basketball players
Basketball players from New York City
Detroit Gems players
Erasmus Hall High School alumni
Forwards (basketball)
Guards (basketball)
Sportspeople from Queens, New York
Tri-Cities Blackhawks players